The Zed Tennis Open were a series of tournaments for professional female tennis players played on outdoor hardcourts. The events, classified as $100,000 and $60,000 ITF Women's Circuit tournaments, had been held in Cairo, Egypt, in 2020.

Past finals

Singles

Doubles

External links
 ITF search

ITF Women's World Tennis Tour
Recurring sporting events established in 2020
Hard court tennis tournaments
Tennis tournaments in Egypt